Tarragona is a province of eastern Spain, in the southern part of the autonomous community of Catalonia. It is bordered by the provinces of Castellón, Teruel, Zaragoza, Lérida and Barcelona and by the Mediterranean Sea.

The province's population is 795,902 (2018), about one fifth of whom live in the capital, Tarragona. Some of the larger cities and towns in Tarragona province include Reus, Salou, El Vendrell, Tortosa, Valls, Amposta. This province has 183 municipalities. The province includes several World Heritage Sites and is a popular tourist destination. There are Roman Catholic cathedrals in Tarragona and Tortosa.

History
After the Umayyad conquest of Hispania in the late eighth century, this part of Spain came under the control of the Umayyad Caliphate and most of the Iberian peninsula was known as Al-Andalus, and was dominated by Muslim rulers. Abd al-Rahman I founded an independent dynasty that survived in the region until the 11th century. 

After the Muslim conquest, the bishopric of Tarragona came under the jurisdiction of the metropolitans of Narbonne or Auch in southern France. In 1089, this was reorganised, and it came under the jurisdiction of the bishopric of Vich, and in 1118, after Tarragona had been reconquered, the Roman Catholic Archdiocese of Tarragona was established.

Geography
The province of Tarragona is in the northeast of Spain with a coast on the Mediterranean Sea. Much of the province is hilly or mountainous and the main feature is the broad valley of the River Ebro and the coastal plain which is backed by the Catalan ranges. In general, industrial development is on the coast and inland is predominantly forest and agricultural land. The Mediterranean Sea lies to the southeast of the province, the province of Barcelona lies to the northeast, Lérida lies to the north, Zaragoza to the northwest, Teruel to the west and Castellón to the southwest. The climate is Mediterranean with hot, dry summers and warm, wet winters.

The main crops are cereals, grapes, fruit, olives, hemp, and silk. The province has some mineral resources; copper, lead and silver are found and limestone and marble are quarried. Quarrying for aggregate has caused groundwater levels to fall and the environment has been adversely affected by the arrival of invasive species such as the zebra mussel in the Riba-roja d'Ebre reservoir on the Ebro, the invasive fish Gambusia in the Ebro delta and chemical contamination in the Flix reservoir beside which is a chemical works and a hydro-electric plant.

Population
The historical population is given in the following chart:

Tourism
As well as the port city of Tarragona, the province has much to offer for the tourist. There are Catalan villages to visit, historic sites, sandy beaches, rocky shores, crags, rivers and woodlands and several wildlife reserves. The area has been publicised under the Costa Daurada (golden coast) brand.

The city of Tarragona may have been founded by the Phoenicians and was a major city in Roman times that they called Tarraco. There are many archaeological remains from that period but little remains of the second century amphitheatre; after the collapse of the Western Roman Empire, the abandoned structure was quarried to provide stone for building. The Les Ferreres Aqueduct dates from the same period and has survived intact. It was built to supply water to the ancient city and is part of the Archaeological Ensemble of Tarraco which has been listed as a UNESCO World Heritage Site since 2000. The city also houses a cathedral, dating from the twelfth and thirteenth centuries, which combines Romanesque and Gothic architectural features. There are also many historic churches and convents.

The Catalan authorities have designated four villages as "family holiday destinations". These are Calafell, Cambrils, La Pineda and nearby Vila-seca, and Salou. Salou is the site of the PortAventura World (PortAventura Park, the most visited theme park in Spain, Ferrari Land and also the PortAventura Caribe Aquatic Park).

The Costa Daurada is served by Reus Airport which receives tourist traffic from passengers journeying to the beach resorts of Salou and Cambrils as well as those travelling to Barcelona. It is a destination of low-cost flights provider Ryanair, and planes fly to Reus from many different European and North African locations. The province also has good road and rail links to Barcelona and southwards to Valencia, Murcia and Andalusia along the coastal strip, and high-speed rail services from Tarragona to Madrid started in 2008.

There are several monasteries in the province that can be visited by following the "Cistercian Monastery Route". The best known is the Cistercian monastery of Poblet in the comarca of Conca de Barberà, which is a UNESCO World Heritage site. Other monasteries on the route include the Santes Creus, in the municipality of Aiguamúrcia, and Vallbona de les Monges.

Other attractions of the province include the food and wine. The "Penedès Wine and Cava Route" is a tourist trail offering wine-related activities. There are also festivals celebrating local fare, where local gastronomic specialities are eaten, including calçots (grilled spring onions) in Valls, and Xató a sauce served with fish or an endive salad.

See also
List of communities in Tarragona
Comarques of Catalonia

References